Hellinsia cervicalis is a moth of the family Pterophoridae. It is found in Bolivia.

References

Moths described in 1932
cervicalis
Moths of South America
Fauna of Bolivia